Roni Dalumi (or Daloomi, ; born ) is an Israeli singer-songwriter and actress. She is the winner of the singing competition show Kochav Nolad 7 in 2009. She starred in the original Israeli series Euphoria.

Early life
Dalumi was born in Beersheba, Israel, and raised in the neighbouring town of Omer, Israel, to Israeli-born parents of both Sephardi Jewish and Mizrahi Jewish (Libyan-Jewish and Iraqi-Jewish) descent. Until the age of 12 she studied dancing at Bat-Dor Beer Sheva Municipal Dance Centre in Beersheba. She majored in theatre at the Mekif Omer High School.

She participated in a children's song festival Shir Nolad in 2006, that took place during the eight-days Jewish holiday of Hanukkah.

In 2010, Dalumi was enlisted to the Israel Defense Forces (IDF), and served for two years in the military band of the Education and Youth Corps.

Star is Born contest 
Dalumi was the judges' least favorite contestant in Israel's Kokhav Nolad after being ranked last by most of them throughout the season, especially by Gal Uchovsky. Despite this, Daloomi was saved by the audience every time, eventually making it to the final in Eilat, Israel, where she won the competition with 61% of the votes (after being ranked last by the judges once again). Daloomi is the youngest winner of the show to date, being only 17 years old at the time, and the first female to win since first season's winner Ninet Tayeb.

Auditions:

Performances during the competition:

Music career
Daloomi released her first single, "Ten" (Give) in April 2010. "Ten" was a Hebrew version to Gloria Estefan's "Hoy", with Hebrew lyrics written by Gilad Segev. The song was nominated for "Song Of The Year." Three months later she released her second single (also a Latin cover): "Ktzat Acheret" (A Little Different), bringing Daloomi nominations for "Singer Of The Year." She won the title on  Channel 24 and the children's Channel. "Ten" was voted "Song Of The Year" on the Children's Channel. In November 2010 her third single, critically acclaimed "Kach O' Kach" (Either way), also a cover of Robi Draco Rosa's "Crash Push" (English version of the song "Más y Más"), was released.

Daloomi released her debut album titled "Ktzat Acheret" (A Little Different) on December 20, 2010. The album includes ten songs in the spirit of Latin Music, including two songs which Daloomi co-wrote, and a duet with Colombian singer Marta Gomez to her song "Paula Ausente"(Absent Paula), which came out as a single on February, 2011. The album received generally positive reviews, but was also criticized for consisting mostly covered versions of Latin Pop music from South America. The idea for the cover-concept album of Latin Music came after Daloomi's much praised performance of "Cada Dia" (Everyday), a song  originally performed by Marta Gomez in the third Idan Raichel's Project album.

Daloomi released the song "Shilchi Oto" (Send Him Away) in April 2011. The song, written by Binyamin Frank and composed by Ronit Shachar, is from a memorial day project by Galei Tzahal radio station called "Od Me'at Nahafoch Leshir" (Soon We'll Become A Song) that gathers lyrics and poetry by deceased IDF soldiers and have them composed and performed by Israeli artists.

Daloomi took part in the annual Israeli children's songs' competition Festigal (during the Jewish holiday of Hanukkah), in the role of Scheherazade, performing with the song Nigmeru Li HaMilim (lit. I'm Out Of Words) and won second place.

On July 8, 2013, Daloomi released her second album called "Tahaziku", the album includes ten songs too, including the first single that released from the album
And his theme song "Tahaziku" (hold), in addition the album includes another three singles, that called "Panai laruach" (my face to the wind), "Stam shnei anashim" (just two people) and "Ktze haiom" (end of the day). The first two singles released on 2012, and the last two, at 2013. Another songs from the album "Karka'it nemucha" (a low ground) and "Yom shishi" (Friday) (like "Saturday night" in Israel)  released as singles after the album released, on 2013 and 2014 (respectively).

See also
Music of Israel
Women of Israel
List of Israelis

References 

1991 births
21st-century Israeli women singers
Israeli women singer-songwriters
21st-century Israeli actresses
Israeli people of Iraqi-Jewish descent
Israeli people of Libyan-Jewish descent
Kokhav Nolad winners
Living people
Israeli Sephardi Jews
Israeli Mizrahi Jews
Musicians from Beersheba
People from Omer, Israel
Actors from Beersheba